Salvia cuspidata is a perennial shrub native to the Andes mountains in Bolivia, Chile, and Peru, growing at elevations up to .

Salvia cuspidata subsp. gilliesii, originally named Salvia gilliesii by George Bentham in 1873, was renamed Salvia cuspidata subsp. gilliesii in 2007. It has been only recently that gardeners have discovered the plant. It has been grown and distributed on the French Riviera since 1994 and in the U.S. since 2002.

New stems in early spring are light green  and square, quickly becoming rounded, woody, and a soft gray color. The many upright stems in a small space give the plant a tall, airy appearance. The lanceolate-shaped, serrated leaves are graduated in size, with white undersides that have pronounced veining, and lightly cover the plant. There are 3–6 flowers in well-spaced whorls on branched inflorescences. The upper lip has a whitish dusting, the wider lower lip has two white lines that lead insects to the nectar.

References

cuspidata
Flora of Bolivia
Flora of Chile
Flora of Peru
Plants described in 1873